Nazifi Abdulsalam Yusuf (born 2 February 1982) better known stage name Nazifi Asnanic is a Nigerian singer, songwriter, director, and producer. He was born and raised in the ancient city of Kano. Nazifi Asnanic often referred to as the Golden Voice, he is recognized as one of the most successful Hausa artists of all time in the history of Kannywood. He has received numbers of awards and nominations including City People Entertainment Awards as the best musician in 2014. He was also among the Kannywood stars that received an award by Zamfara State government of Nigeria for their tremendous effort and contribution toward uniting and sustaining Hausa culture. Nazifi Asnanic has featured, produced, and directed numbers of film in Kannywood.

Career
Nazifi Abdulsalam Yusuf (Nazifi Asnanic) begins his musical career in early 2000. In 2002, he dropped his debut album with 10 songs including Dawo Dawo. He caught the attention of directors, and Producer like Ali Nuhu and Aminu Saira where he sang for FKD production and Saira Movies in Ga Duhu Ga Haske and Sai Wata Rana. Nazifi Asnanic released more 10 albums, and sold millions of copies in Nigeria and worldwide making him one of the most successful in Kannywood.
Apart from singing and music production, Nazifi has produced and directed a lot of movies such as Rai da Buri, Shu’uma, Ba’asi and many more.

Discography
Studio albums
 Labarina (2009)
 Daga Ni Sai Ke (2010)
 Bunjuma (2011)
 Dan Marayan Zaki (2012)
 Dakin Amarya (2013)
 Rayuwa (2014)
 Kambu
 Ruwan Zuma ‘’(2013)’’
 Abu uku

Filmography

References

21st-century Nigerian male actors
Hausa-language mass media
Living people
People from Kano
Male actors in Hausa cinema
1982 births